Lecidopyrenopsis is a genus of fungi within the family Lichinaceae. This is a monotypic genus, containing the single species Lecidopyrenopsis corticola.

References

Lichinomycetes
Lichen genera
Monotypic Ascomycota genera
Taxa named by Edvard August Vainio